The Telescopium−Grus Cloud is a galaxy filament in the constellations of Pavo, Indus, and Telescopium. It was first defined by astronomer Brent Tully in his book The Nearby Galaxies Atlas and its companion book The Nearby Galaxies Catalog.

Physical characteristics 
The Telescopium−Grus Cloud is a collection of at least 24 galaxy groups. It is low density galaxy filament, with no central concentration of galaxies. The filament along with the Pavo-Indus Supercluster form parts of a wall bounding the Local Void. Likewise, both structures also form a wall bounding the Sculptor Void.

The Telescopium−Grus Cloud is a branch that is part of a larger filament extending from the Centaurus Cluster that is known as the Southern Supercluster strand which also encompasses the Fornax-Eridanus-Dorado complex which is also known as the Southern Supercluster. The Southern Supercluster strand extends all the way to the Perseus–Pisces Supercluster.

Observational history
Even before the Telescopium−Grus Cloud was identified, major concentrations in the filament were identified: group G27 which would later be known as the Grus Group, group G39 which would later be known as the NGC 134 Group, group G45 (Pavo-Indus) which would later be known as the NGC 7079, NGC 7144, NGC 7196 and NGC 7213 groups, and group G52 which would later be known as the Telescopium Cluster. These concentrations were first identified by astronomer Gérard de Vaucouleurs in 1975.      

In 1987, astronomer Brent Tully with colleague Richard Fisher first intensified and described the Telescopium−Grus Cloud in his book The Nearby Galaxies Atlas and its companion book The Nearby Galaxies Catalog. Later in 1992, Fouque et al. grouped the Telescopium−Grus Cloud, also known as cloud 61 in the book The Nearby Galaxies Atlas along with the Pavo-Indus Spur (cloud 62), the Pisces Austrinus Spur (cloud 63), the Pegaus Cloud and Pegaus Spur (clouds 64 and 65) with the Pavo-Indus Suercluster which at the time was known as the Indus Supercluster. However in a paper published in 1993 titled, Dynamics of the Pavo-Indus and Grus clouds of galaxies., Fouque et al. instead classified the Telescopium−Grus Cloud as a connection between the Pavo–Indus Supercluster and the Local Supercluster.

In 2001, Pebeles et.al identified another galaxy filament that originates at the Virgo Cluster, passes though a knot of galaxies containing the Sombrero Galaxy, then passes at its closest point to the Milky Way at the Centaurus/M83 group, and then passes from the perspective from the Milky Way though the galactic plane near the Circinus galaxy to meet up with the Telescopium−Grus Cloud. In 2013, Courtois et al. identified a filament extending from the Centaurus Cluster that is associated with a structure intentfied in 1956 by Gérard de Vaucouleurs: The Southern Supercluster. The Southern Supercluster contains 3 major concentrations of galaxies: The Fornax Cluster, The Dorado Group and Eridanus cluster, along with many other groups of galaxies. The Telescopium−Grus Cloud would now be considered a branch of this larger filament along with the Southern Supercluster which is also known as the Fornax–Eridanus–Dorado complex. The Telescopium−Grus Cloud would be designated as branch SSCb of this filament, and the Southern Supercluster would be designated as branch SSCa. In 2017, Pomarède et al. revealed that this filament, now known as the Southern Supercluster strand along with another filament known as the Antila strand, extend all the way to the Perseus–Pisces Supercluster.

List of groups
Below is a list of groups in the Telescopium–Grus Cloud according to astronomer Brent Tully. 

 Column 1: The name of the group in Tully's NBGG
 Column 2: The right ascension for epoch 2000.
 Column 3: The declination for epoch 2000.
 Column 4: Number of members of the group.
 Column 5: Brightest member of the group
 Column 6: Redshift of the group.
 Column 7: Distance of the group (Millions of light-years).
 Column 8: Cross-Identifications with other catalogs.

(Sources for data columns:)

See also
 Large-scale structure of the universe
 Galaxy filament
 Southern Supercluster

References 

Galaxy filaments
Large-scale structure of the cosmos
Astronomical objects discovered in 1987
Southern Supercluster
Telescopium−Grus Cloud